Marjayoun (:  Lebanese pronunciation), also Marj 'Ayoun, Marjuyun or Marjeyoun (lit. "meadow of springs") and Jdeideh / Jdeida / Jdeidet Marjeyoun, is a Lebanese town and an administrative district, the Marjeyoun District, in the Nabatieh Governorate in Southern Lebanon.

Geography
It is not to be confused with the Banias Springs at Caesarea Philippi.

Marjeyoun stands on a hill facing Mt Hermon to the east, the Crusader castle of Beaufort, set above the Litani River and overlooking Mount Amel (Jabal Amel), to the west, the Mount Lebanon range with the Rihan and Niha peaks to the north, with the fertile Marjeyoun plains extending southward into the Galilee plains and the Golan Heights.

History

Crusader period
On June 10, 1179, during the Battle of Marj Ayyun, an Ayyubid army defeated a crusader army. The crusader king narrowly escaped being captured in the rout.

Ottoman period
In  the 1596 tax records, it was named as a village,  Jadida, in the Ottoman nahiya (subdistrict) of Tibnin  under the liwa' (district) of Safad, with a population of  28 households and 12 bachelors, all Muslim. The villagers paid a fixed  tax-rate of 25%  on  agricultural products, such as wheat, barley, olive trees, vineyards, goats and beehives, in addition to  "occasional revenues" and a press for olive oil or grape syrup; a total of 9,606 akçe.

In 1875 Victor Guérin visited Marjayoun (which he called Djedeideh), and found it to have about 2,000 inhabitants, mostly "Schismatic Greek" (i.e. Melkite Uniats), but also some Greek Orthodox and Muslims.

The Saint Peter's Cathedral was built in 1892 and it was restored in 1968 after a fire.

20th-21st centuries

During the Syria-Lebanon Campaign of World War II, British and Australian forces advancing from Palestine entered the town on 11 June 1941 against badly equipped defenders, but were forced to withdraw on 15 June following a Vichy French counterattack. The Allies recaptured the town on 24 June in the Battle of Merdjayoun.

Marjayoun was the headquarters of the South Lebanon Army, the Israel-affiliated militia that controlled southern Lebanon during Israel's occupation of the region after the 1982 Lebanon War until Israel's withdrawal from the region in 2000.

During the 2006 war between Israel and the Hezbollah organisation, after cease-fire negotiations stalled on August 10, Israeli forces took control of Marjayoun. The next day, a convoy of 3,000 people fled from the town. The bombing resulted in the deaths of at least seven people, and is known as the Marjayoun convoy incident.

Demography

The town of Marjayoun has an overwhelmingly Christian population of about 5,000 people. Greek Orthodox Christians compose the vast majority of the town's population, however, there are also Maronite and Greek Catholic Christians living in Marjayoun. Outside the town, most villages in the surrounding valleys and mountains are predominantly Shia Muslim.

The Melkite Saint Peter's Cathedral was built in 1892 and restored in 1968 after a fire and in 2009. Marjayoun is the seat of the Melkite (Greek Catholic) Archeparchy of Baniyas, which includes the southeastern part of Lebanon.

Parliamentary representation
The district of Marjayoun, which includes the town, is largely Shia Muslim. It holds three seats in the Lebanese government, two belonging to Shia Muslims and one belonging to Greek Orthodox Christians.

Hospital

Marjayoun is home to a regional government hospital founded in 1960,  and a Lebanese Red Cross First Aid Center.

Marjayoun Airfield

Ruins of buildings and outline of the runways and taxiway are all that remains.
In a strategic triangle linking Lebanon with Palestine and Syria are located the ruins of "Marjayoun Airport" or what is known as "Al-Marj Airport" or "English Airport". The green color of the Marjayoun Plain is only disturbed by forgotten walls from the days of World War II, their hard stones separating the fertile agricultural lands of the Marjayoun Plain. During the Second World War, the region of the Marjayoun Plain formed an arena of confrontation between the allies on one side and the German army on the other, so the allies had to fortify themselves, specifically in the Marjayoun Plain, which was a defensive area or a back line of confrontations if Egypt fell into the hands of the German army, or if the German Army managed to advance into Palestine, Lebanon and Syria.

Notable people
Michael DeBakey (1908–2008) – cardiac surgeon, whose parents are from Marjeyoun
Brigitte Gabriel – journalist, author and lecturer
Walid Gholmieh – director of the Le Conservatoire libanais national supérieur de musique; born in Marjeyoun
Major Saad Haddad – founder and head of the South Lebanon Army (SLA) during the Lebanese Civil War
James Jabara – Lebanese-American U.S. Air Force Major, the first jet ace of the Korean war, flew missions in WW II and Vietnam; born in 1923 in Muskogee, Oklahoma, both his father, John Jabara, and mother being immigrants from Marjeyoun
 Dr. Richard Jabara, born in Marjeyoun (1920–1967), philanthropist, founded several hospitals from Tripoli in Lebanon to Saudi Arabia
George Jordac (1931–2014) –  author and poet.
Alfred Naifeh, born 1915 in Covington, Tennessee, to a Lebanese immigrant family from Jdeidet Marjeyoun; U.S. naval destroyer USS Naifeh is named after him
Issam Mahfouz (1939–2006) – writer, journalist
Anthony Shadid – journalist
Michael Shadid – physician, born in Marjeyoun
 General Ghassan Barakat; Former General in the Internal Security Forces
Saad Ayoub Tayar(1888-1958)
Lebanese-Mexican Textile and Real Estate Entrepreneur http://www.emigrantelibanes.com/cgi-bin/InmiDatos?RN=%20%20%20%20%20%201272&MuestraImagen=1

See also
Antiochian Greek Christians
Arab Christians
Christianity in Lebanon
Greek genocide
Greek Orthodox (Roum Orthodox) Christians in Lebanon
History of Arab Christians
History of Eastern Christianity
History of the Eastern Orthodox Church under the Ottoman Empire
Lebanese Americans
Persecution of Eastern Orthodox Christians

References

Bibliography

External links
 Marjaayoun, Localiban 
 Marjeyoun Heritage Preservation Program (MHPP)
 marjeyoun.net - unofficial website
 Information about Marjayoun, Lebanon at marjayoun.com
 Khiam official website
 "Jdeideh Marjeyoun Now & Then" video (MHPP)
 Marjayoun on Google Map

Photo galleries
 Marjeyoum Photo Album
 Baladiyat Marjeyoun photo gallery
 A view of Marjeyoun by satellite
 (MHPP) Marjeyoun Photo and video gallery

Videos
 (MHPP) Jdeidet Marjeyoun 1,000 Year History (English Version)
 Tour of Jdeidet Marjeyoun, Lebanon
 (MHPP) Road Trip To Jdeidet Marjeyoun
 Easter 2014 in Jdeidet Marjeyoun
 (MHPP) Jdeida Lives Now and Then

Eastern Orthodox Christian communities in Lebanon
Populated places in the Israeli security zone 1985–2000
Israeli–Lebanese conflict
Maronite Christian communities in Lebanon
Melkite Christian communities in Lebanon
Populated places in Marjeyoun District
Shia Muslim communities in Lebanon
Sunni Muslim communities in Lebanon